Noakhailla, also known by the exonym Noakhalian, is a dialect of Bengali, spoken by an estimated 7 million people, primarily in the Greater Noakhali region of Bangladesh as well as southern parts of Tripura in India. Outside of these regions, there are substantial numbers of Noakhailla speakers in other parts of Bangladesh; as well as diaspora communities in the Middle East, Italy, Europe and the United States.

Noakhailla dialect has no presence in formal settings, neither in Bangladesh nor India, though its standardisation has been prospected. There is a post-modernist demand of the Noakhali Division due to the old history, tradition and culture of Noakhali (currently a district of Chittagong Division) Bangladesh by Noakhailla activists. The movement has gained disrepute and commonly been the subject of meme culture and trolling in Bangladesh.

Etymology
Noakhailla is eponymously named after Noakhali, referring to the dialect spoken of that area. It is in the transformed Vangiya form of the archaic Noakhaliya, where "-iya" is a suffix, commonly used in Bengali as a demonym, having gone through a linguistic process called Apinihiti, a form of epithesis, to become Noakhailla. It may also be known in English as Noakhalian, a relatively recent term which has gained prominence as a locative demonym since at the least the Pakistan period. "-an" is a suffix, commonly used in English to denote an action or an adjective that suggests pertaining to, thereby forming an agent noun.

History

Noakhailla dialect belongs to the Bengali language that evolved from Magadhi Prakrit. Noakhali, the area which it is named after, emerged in the 13th century as a center of regional territorialism by the name of Bhulua. The kings of Bhulua patronised the Sanskrit language. The arrival of Muslims in Bhulua affected the local language to such a level that several Hindu rulers of Bhulua even took the Turkic title of Khan. Muslim migration was extended following the Mughal conquest of Bhulua in which the local language became influenced by languages such as Arabic and Persian. The great lexical influence of Arabic can still be found in Noakhailla today.

Its strong folk tradition dates back several centuries. During colonial rule, Irish linguist George Abraham Grierson collected two Noakhailla folk poems; one from the island of Hatia, which is off the coast of the Noakhali mainland, and another from Ramganj, presently in Lakshmipur District. The pure Portuguese merchants and Roman Catholic missionaries which settled in Noakhali also adopted the local language as late as the 1920s.

In December 2019, a mass demonstration was organised by Noakhailla activists of all strata in Maijdee in response to a private television channel airing the Noakhali Bibhag Chai (We Want Noakhali Division) comical drama. They considered the drama to be an insult to the Noakhailla dialect, history and culture.

Status and usage
Noakhailla has no formal recognition or use of the Noakhailla dialect in public, in courts, or in the legislature like the existent standard Bangla. The educated, elite, political and influential groups of Bangladesh bearing Noakhali homogeneity, or being intrinsically exposed to the socio-cultural phenomenon of Noakhali, usually prefer the standard form of Bangla for their wider communication. They keep this language as their private means of communication only with members of the homogenous community of Greater Noakhali.

There are many Noakhaillas who boldly express their roots. However, its usage is now in decline as more and more Noakhailla families are opting to raise their children to speak in Standard Bengali due to it being the official medium in the country and the negative stereotypes relating to Noakhali held by other parts of Bengal. It is often becoming the case that Generation Z urban Noakhaillas cannot speak in Noakhailla though it is commonly spoken by their grandparents in their homes. In contrast to speakers of Chittagonian and Sylheti, it is reported that some speakers of Noakhailla sometimes feel a linguistic inferiority complex. Sultana, Dovchin and Pennycook have also highlighted the stigmatisation of Noakhailla within Bangladeshi society.

Classification
 grouped the dialect of Noakhali under Southeastern Bengali, alongside the dialects of Chittagong and Akyab.  places Noakhailla in the eastern Bangali group of dialects of Bengali and notes that all Bengali dialects were independent of each other and did not emanate from the literary form of Bengali called "sadhu bhasha". Along with some Eastern dialects of Bengali, Noakhailla dialect has developed some phonetic and morphological properties that are not present in  other western dialects of Bengali. Some have stated that Noakhailla dialect is "mutually unintelligible" with the Dinajpur dialect (Northern dialect) due to the geographical distance between two dialects.

Geographical distribution
Noakhailla is the primary dialect of Greater Noakhali which today comprises the Bangladeshi districts of Noakhali, Feni and Lakshmipur, and the sub-districts of Hajiganj in Chandpur and Mirsarai in Chittagong. It is also spoken in the southern part of India's Tripura state, specifically in the districts of Sipahijala, South Tripura and Gomati. In these three districts, it serves as a lingua franca among the multiethnic communities of inhabitants residing there such as the Tripuri/Reang, the Chakma, the Mog/Marma in addition to the Noakhailla-Bengalis. Noakhailla is very much mutually intelligible with Sandwipi, which is spoken in Sandwip, an island in the Bay of Bengal.

Before and after the Partition of India, Noakhailla speakers had also migrated to West Bengal and Assam. Outside of the subcontinent, the largest Noakhailla diaspora communities reside in Europe (most notably Italy) and North America. Significant Noakhailla-speaking communities reside in the Middle East of which most are migrant workers, and in many other countries throughout the world.

Writing system
Noakhailla currently does not have a standardised writing system. With Standard Bengali written in the Bengali script as the medium of instruction in Bangladesh, some may therefore write in Noakhailla using the Bengali script, however it is viewed as more formal to write in standard Bengali. The Musalmani Nagri script was historically used in Noakhali up until the latter part of the 20th century, only used in puthis written in the sadhu register of Standard Bengali.

Features and lexical comparison
Noakhailla is an Eastern Bengali language with a large amount of Persian and Hindustani vocabulary. The most notable feature differentiating it from Bengali, Urdu and other Indo-Aryan languages is that words using the p sound in the latter languages are pronounced as h in Noakhailla. An example is the Bengali and Urdu word for water (pani) which is hãni in Noakhailla. Another notable characteristic is the presence of the /x/ sound (akin to خ in Arabic), which is not found in Standard Bengali.

Variations
There are differences in the Noakhailla spoken in different parts of the Greater Noakhali region. In the Linguistic Survey of India, conducted in the early 20th century, the Irish linguist George Abraham Grierson used the phrase a man had two sons to show dialectic diversity.
Standard Bengali: æk jon loker duţi chhele chhilo.
Noakhailla (Grierson): ek zon mainsher duga hola asil.
Noakhailla of Chhagalnaiya: æk zôner dui hola asil. 
Noakhailla of Feni: egga mainsher duga hut/hola asilo.
Noakhailla Hatiya Island: ækzôn mainsher duga hola asil.
Noakhailla of Ramganj: ekzôner dui hut asil.

Grammar
Noakhailla grammar is the study of the morphology and syntax of Noakhailla.

Pronouns

Personal pronouns 
Noakhailla personal pronouns are somewhat similar to English pronouns, having different words for first, second, and third person, and also for singular and plural (unlike for verbs, below). Noakhailla pronouns, like their English counterparts, do differentiate for gender. In addition, each of the second- and third-person pronouns have different forms for the familiar and polite forms; the second person also has a "very familiar" form (sometimes called "despective"). It may be noted that the "very familiar" form is used when addressing particularly close friends or family as well as for addressing subordinates, or in abusive language. In the following tables, the abbreviations used are as follows: VF=very familiar, F=familiar, and P=polite (honor); H=here, T=there, E=elsewhere (proximity), and I=inanimate.

The nominative case is used for pronouns that are the subject of the sentence, such as "I already did that" or "Will you please stop making that noise?"

The possessive case is used to show possession, such as "Where is your coat?" or "Let's go to our house". In addition, sentences such as "I have a book" (আঁর কিতাব আছে) or "I need money" (আঁর টিয়া দরকার) also use the possessive (the literal translation of the Standard Bengali versions of these sentences would be "There is my book" and "There is my need for money" respectively).

Further reading

Bibliography

References

Languages of Bangladesh
Bengali dialects
Languages of Tripura
Languages of Assam
Languages of West Bengal